Umetbayevo (Ömötbay) is a rural locality (a village) in Zigazinsky Selsoviet, Beloretsky District, Bashkortostan, Russia. The population was 32 as of 2010. There is 1 street.

Geography 
Umetbayevo is located 107 km southwest of Beloretsk (the district's administrative centre) by road. Zigaza is the nearest rural locality.

References 

Rural localities in Beloretsky District